The Marine Engineers' Beneficial Association (MEBA) is the oldest maritime trade union in the United States still currently in existence, established in 1875. MEBA primarily represents licensed mariners, especially deck and engine officers working in the United States Merchant Marine aboard US-flagged vessels. It is a member union of the AFL–CIO.

MEBA officers work in both the oceans and the Great Lakes in many settings, including on container ships, tankers (including LNG carriers), cruise ships, drillships, tugboats and ferries, as well as in various capacities in the shoreside ship transport and marine industries and on government-contracted ships of the US Maritime Administration's Ready Reserve Force and US Navy's Military Sealift Command. Merchant mariners deliver critical defense cargo to United States armed forces in times of military conflict.

Members and their families benefit from MEBA's collective bargaining agreements through the union's Medical Plan, 401(k) Plan, Pension Trust, and Vacation Plan.

History
The nation's oldest maritime union was formed out of necessity in the late 19th century. The introduction of steamships in the early 1800s increased the demand of engineers needed to maintain them operating. Steamship owners on the Mississippi and Great Lakes were competing with one another and demanding greater speeds from their vessels. However, the concept of steam engines powering these ships was still relatively new and the study of marine engineering was barely starting to develop as the engineers hired learned aboard the ship. The engineers hired to manage the steam engines were shore-side engineers since the marine engineer did not exist yet. It was a completely new kind of field compared to the shore-side work they were used to. The unfamiliarity with the specifics of what engineers were working with and the fact that the steam engine was in its earliest stages meant that the ships were boarded with engineers of minimal marine engineering knowledge and unreliable machinery. This increase in speed greatly reduced safety in the engine room due to fires and boiler explosions. Even with increased risk, the wages remained the same.

The ongoing injuries and deaths from working on the steamships finally motivated engineers to demand a means of safety regulations from Congress in order to acquire protection and improve their working conditions. In 1838, the first Steamboat Act was implemented, however it was very inefficient because its legislation was vague and so the tragedies on steamships continued. The lack of improvement from the Steamboat Act led to and even greater demand to make the act stronger and more efficient. This continued until 1852 when Congress passed an enhanced version of the Steamboat Act which required engineers to have a license to work on steamboats and enforced an inspection system for the machinery.

The first gathering of the Buffalo Association of Engineers in 1854 an essential role model for the unionization of MEBA. The Buffalo Association of Engineers implemented the topics of discussion such as wage which helped them fight wage cuts until they dismembered the association. When wages started to be cut again, cities such as Cleveland, Chicago, and Detroit took after the Buffalo association and created organizations of their own. Individually, these city-wide associations were merely effective, therefore this brought on the idea to unite the one-city associations as a national movement. The Buffalo Association of Engineers began corresponding with other marine engineer associations around the country. In February 1875, the leaders of five steamship unions out of Buffalo, New York, Cleveland, Ohio, Detroit, Michigan, Chicago, Illinois, and Baltimore, Maryland, convened in Cleveland, Ohio, to join together.  This organization called itself the National Marine Engineers Association and chose Garret Douw of Buffalo as its president. (The word Beneficial was not added until 1883.)

After Marine Engineers' Beneficial Association's formation, the union lobbied Washington legislators to pass bills in 1884 and 1896 that would make it law for all American vessels to only possess American officers, and to grant the ability for marine engineers to attain licenses, respectably.  During World War I, the need for more engineers called for the US government to quickly train marine engineers,  however, after the war, such practices continued, and on January 20, 1919, the Marine Engineers' Beneficial Association agreed to petition the use of "30 day engineers", believing there are enough resources to properly train the next generation of merchant marines.  The Marine Engineers' Beneficial Association, as did a wide variety of worker unions, supplied labor during World War II for both naval and engineering spectrum. MEBA's membership, like that of all American maritime unions has varied widely over the years. At the end of World War I, they had more than 22,000 members, but by 1934, their membership was down to 4,848. Membership ballooned during World War II, with job opportunities for about 200,000 seamen.

Following the establishment of the US Naval Academy in the 1800s, the Marine Engineers’ Beneficial Association established the Calhoon Marine Engineers’ Beneficial Association Engineering School in 1966 in the Southern Hotel, Baltimore, Maryland.  The maritime school offers over fifty courses to union members and outside engineering professionals (as of May 1, 2007) and provides living arrangements for attendees.

Presidents
1875 : Garret Douw
1876–1881 : Abner L. Foote
1881 : Thomas H. Nelson
1882 : Edward D. Bateman
1883 : James H. Reid
1884 : William E. Russell
1885 : Andrew Ritter
1886 : Andrew Payne
1887–1888 : Aspinwall Fuller
1889 : Ambrose L. Boyce
1890–1892 : John H. Galway
1893–1903 : George Uhler
1904– 1906 : Frank A. Jones
1907–1914 : William F. Yates
1915–1916 : A. Bruce Gibson
1917–1926 : William S. Brown
1926–1930 : William F. Yates
1930–1934 : C.M. Sheplar
1935–1936 : William S. Brown
1937–1949 : Samuel J. Hogan
1950–1959 : Herbert L. Daggett
1960–1963 : E.N. Altman
1963–1984 : Jesse M. Calhoon

1985–1992 : C.E. (Gene) DeFries
1992–1994 : Gordon Ward
1995 : Joel Bem
1996–1998 : Alex Shandrowsky
1999–2001 : Larry O'Toole
2002–2007 : Ron Davis
2008—2010 : Don Keefe
2011—2013 : Mike Jewell
2014—2020 : Marshall Ainley
2021—     : Adam Vokac

Union benefits 
By becoming a MEBA member, MEBA provides a medical plan includes prescription drugs, dental, mental health, disability, life, accidental death, and dismemberment benefits for MEBA members and their dependents by completing what they call a Permanent Data Form. They also offer four kinds of MEBA Pension Plans. The “Regular Pension Plan” means members can retire with a regular pension plan if members have twenty years of accredited pension years, regardless of what age they retire. The “Reduced Pension Plan” is for those who have less than twenty accredited pension years and have reached the normal retirement age of sixty-five years old or the fifth anniversary of the start date of the pension plan. The “Early Retirement Pension” is for those who choose to retire early when members reach the age of sixty and have a minimum of fifteen accredited pension years. Lastly, there is the “Disability Pension” in which members can retire early if they have become permanently disabled and have a minimum of ten accredited pension years. There are also ways these pensions can be distributed in situation of marriage, children, and death. MEBA also provides a 401(k) plan in which members have the option enroll for and if they do they can name a beneficiary. A Vacation Plan is also provided in which is determined by the collective bargaining agreement with the employer, the type of vessel members work on, number of days of Covered Employment, and their rating.

Directory information 

Headquarters: 444 North Capitol Street, N.W., Suite 800, Washington, DC 20001-1570

 Current President: Adam Vokac (2021–present)
 Current Executive Vice President: Claudia Cimini (2021–present)
 Current  Secretary-Treasurer: Roland "Rex" Rexha (2021–present)
 Current Atlantic Coast Vice President: Jason Callahan (2017–present)
 Current Gulf Coast Vice President: Adam Smith (2021–present)

Associated port locations 

 Seattle, Washington
 San Francisco/ Oakland, California
 Los Angeles/ San Pedro, California
 Honolulu, Hawaii
 Houston, Texas
 New Orleans, Louisiana
 Tampa, Florida
 Jacksonville, Florida
 Charleston, South Carolina
 Norfolk, Virginia
 Baltimore, Maryland
 New York/ New Jersey
 Cleveland, Ohio
 Boston, Massachusetts

See also

International Organization of Masters, Mates & Pilots
Seafarers International Union of North America
National Maritime Union
Maritime Trades Department, AFL–CIO
United States Merchant Marine
United States Maritime Administration
American Bureau of Shipping
International Maritime Organization

References

External links

MEBA Plans
Marine Engineers, from the Waterfront Workers History Project
Calhoon MEBA Engineering School
State Maritime Academies
Election contributions at OpenSecrets
MEBA on Facebook

Archives
 National Marine Engineers' Beneficial Association Records. 1926–1939. 10 cubic feet. At the Labor Archives of Washington State, University of Washington Libraries Special Collections.
 Guide to the Vernon R. Stedman Papers. 1933–1972. 1.21 cubic feet (2 boxes).

Trade unions established in 1875
AFL–CIO
Maritime history of the United States
Maritime trade unions